Here's Love is an album by American jazz pianist Hank Jones featuring interpretations of music from Meredith Willson's Broadway musical Here's Love (based on the film "Miracle on 34th Street.") recorded in 1963 for the Argo label.

Reception

Allmusic awarded the album 3 stars.

Track listing
All compositions by Meredith Wilson
 "Here's Love" - 2:47
 "My Wish" - 3:38
 "You Don't Know" - 3:13		
 "Dear Mister Santa Claus" - 4:00
 "That Man Over There" - 2:57
 "Arm in Arm" - 3:48
 "The Big Clown Balloons" - 2:17
 "Love, Come Take Me Again" - 2:03
 "Pine Cones and Holly Berries" - 4:46
 "My State, My Kansas, My Home" - 2:33

Personnel 
Hank Jones - piano
Kenny Burrell - guitar 
Milt Hinton - bass
Elvin Jones - drums

References 

1963 albums
Hank Jones albums
Argo Records albums
Albums produced by Esmond Edwards
Albums recorded at Van Gelder Studio